Featherstone is a village in the district of South Staffordshire, England, near to the border with Wolverhampton.

History
Originally a farming community consisting of a few scattered farms, it is mentioned in the Domesday Book of 1086 and was owned by the clergy of Wolverhampton Church. It is possible that the population numbers were fairly static until the opening of a new mine, Hilton Main, in the 1920s, it closed in 1969.

The Duke of Cleveland was lord of the manor of this small township of 550 acres and just 34 souls in 1851. This was once the residence of John Huntbach, the noted antiquary. The principal inhabitants were Joshua Price and Edward Tunycliffe, farmers, John Perry the lock manufacturer and Thomas Hill a vermin killer.

The village's population at the time of the 1851 census was 35. By 1921 this had risen to 39. By the time of the 2001 census it was 3,948.

Today
The village has one primary school, Featherstone Academy and a pub, the Red, White and Blue.

Recently controversy was sparked over the proposed building of 1,500 houses on green belt land, although many people believed the extra facilities proposed would make the village a better place to live. After much public opposition, this plan was rejected in early 2009.

Featherstone also has a Methodist church and some small shops. There are three off licences (Featherstone Supermarket, Featherstone Wine Lodge and Costcutter) a hairdresser and a chemist.
In 2008 there was some concern over the future of the post office, but it was not one of those closed.

On the outskirts of the village are three prisons; HM Prison Featherstone, HM Prison Oakwood and HM Prison Brinsford, which is also a Youth Offender Institution (YOI).

Nearby is the site of the former Brinsford Lodge Teachers' Training College and Polytechnic Hall of Residence. The site of the old college, which stood near Oakwood Prison, is rich in history. There are traces of several old Second World War shelters and tiles from the kitchens.

Schools
Featherstone Academy, the Avenue (formerly Whitgreave Primary School)

Churches
Featherstone is part of the ecclesiastical Parish of Shareshill, where the Parish Church of St Mary & St Luke is situated.

There is a Methodist chapel sited at the junction of the Avenue and the A460.

Shops and pubs
The Red, White and Blue public house was built in the 1920s to replace a much older building nearby.

Transport links
The village has a regular bus service (service 70, Mon-Sat) to Wolverhampton and Cannock.  All journeys serve New Cross Hospital before continuing to Wolverhampton. The bus frequency then is hourly both ways. The bus service is run by D&G Bus trading as Chaserider. In addition Select Bus service 67 runs three times daily Mon-Fri between Wolverhampton and Cannock via Wedge Mills and Bushbury. This service also serves Featherstone Prison.  

The nearest active railway station to Featherstone is Landywood on the Chase Line and Wolverhampton on the West Coast Main Line.

Political representation
Featherstone has a parish council with two wards.
Brinsford Ward, two councillors.
Featherstone Ward, nine councillors.

Featherstone is represented in the House of Commons by Member of Parliament Gavin Williamson, Conservative member for South Staffordshire.

Notable people 
 Andy Thompson (born 1967 in Featherstone) an English former footballer, played 533 professional games, of which 376 were for Wolverhampton Wanderers F.C.

See also
Listed buildings in Featherstone, Staffordshire

References

External links

Villages in Staffordshire
South Staffordshire District